Sangsad Bangladesh Television, often known as Sangsad Television, branded on-air as Sangsad Bangladesh, is a Bangladeshi state-owned parliamentary television channel, which is the sister of Bangladesh Television. It was launched on 25 January 2011, and broadcasts live from the National Parliament of Bangladesh.

Other than that, variety of other programming, such as ones that are educational and regarding development, is broadcast during the channel's last two hours of daily broadcasting. However, in case if there is no parliamentary session, Sangsad Television would broadcast daily from 18:00 to 20:00 (BST). The channel is operated by the Ministry of Information, and is a terrestrial television channel. It is also a free-to-air television channel.

History
On 11 February 2010, member of Parliament Benzir Ahmed proposed the launch of a television channel named 'Sangsad Bangladesh' for the need to broadcast live parliament sessions to the people.

Sangsad Television began broadcasting on 25 January 2011 on both satellite and digital terrestrial television, after the legislature voted in favor of establishing a channel dedicated to live parliamentary broadcasts, using the facilities of Bangladesh Television. On 9 February 2020, due to technical difficulties, Sangsad Television did not show live parliamentary broadcasts, and instead broadcast music programming that day.

In March 2020, during the COVID-19 pandemic, which caused schools to shutdown in Bangladesh, Sangsad Television, along with BTV, began airing educational live lessons for primary and secondary-level students. The channel had become more important for students to learn at home.

In May 2021, Sangsad Television became available to be streamed worldwide, along with its three sister channels, via the BTV app. In May 2022, the Government of Bangladesh ordered the broadcast of Sangsad Television, along with its sisters, in airports across the country.

Programming 
Sangsad Television mainly broadcasts live broadcasts from the Jatiya Sangsad Bhaban during the evenings. It also sometimes broadcasts the history of the Parliament of Bangladesh and its legislative practices overseas. During the COVID-19 pandemic, Sangsad Television aired live lessons for students with time slots depending on the grade level. The channel uses Bangabandhu-1 for broadcasting on satellite television.

References 

Public television in Bangladesh
Government of Bangladesh
Television channels in Bangladesh
Mass media in Dhaka
Television channels and stations established in 2011
2011 establishments in Bangladesh
Legislature broadcasters